Hedwig Conrad-Martius (Berlin, 27 February 1888 – Starnberg, 15 February 1966) was a German phenomenologist who became a Christian mystic.

Life and works 
She initially considered a literary career, but later became interested in philosophy. This started at the Ludwig Maximilian University of Munich. She also studied at Göttingen. To celebrate its foundation festival, in 1912 Goettingen University gave a prize to the best original work on a philosophical topic. The names of all competitors were sealed, opened only after declaring a winner. Of about 200 philosophical works, only hers - titled "The Intuitional-Theoretical Principles of Positivism" - was awarded the prize. She later became known for work on an ontology of reality. 

She also married Theodor Conrad who helped provide for her as at this time women academics tended to struggle to make a living. As she had one Jewish grandparent her work was stalled by the rise of Nazism. At some point she became religiously active as a Protestant.

Connection to Edith Stein 
Edith Stein's interest in Catholicism came during a visit to her home. Although Protestant, Conrad-Martius would late receive a dispensation so she could be Edith Stein's godmother.

Works 
 Die erkenntnistheoretischen Grundlagen des Positivismus, Bergzabern 1920
 Metaphysische Gespräche, Halle 1921
 Realontologie, in: Jahrbuch für Philosophie und phänomenologische Forschung, 6 (1923), 159–333
 Zur Ontologie und Erscheinungslehre der realen Außenwelt. Verbunden mit einer Kritik positivistischer Theorien, in: Jahrbuch für Philosophie und phänomenologische Forschung 3 (1916)
 Die „Seele“ der Pflanze. Biologisch-ontologische Betrachtungen, Breslau 1934
 Abstammungslehre, München 1949 (Ursprünglich unter dem Titel „Ursprung und Aufbau des lebendigen Kosmos“ erschienen, Kosmos 1938)
 Der Selbstaufbau der Natur, Entelechien und Energien, Hamburg 1944
 Bios und Psyche, Hamburg 1949
 Die Zeit, München 1954
 Utopien der Menschenzüchtung. Der Sozialdarwinismus und seine Folgen, München 1955
 Das Sein, München 1957
 Der Raum, München 1958
 Étude sur la Métaphore, Paris 1958
 Die Geistseele des Menschen, München 1960
 Schriften zur Philosophie I-III, im Einverständnis mit der Verfasserin herausgeben von Eberhard Avé-Lallemant, München 1963–1965

External links 
Munich phenomenology
Hedwig Conrad-Martius: bibliographical and biographical references. - Center for the History of Women Philosophers and Scientists

References 

1888 births
1966 deaths
Phenomenologists
20th-century German philosophers
Protestant philosophers
Writers from Berlin
University of Göttingen alumni
Ludwig Maximilian University of Munich alumni
German people of Jewish descent